Nianzishan District is an outlying district of the city of Qiqihar, Heilongjiang province, China.

Administrative divisions 
Nianzishan District is divided into 4 subdistricts. 
4 subdistricts
 Dong'an, Fuqiang, Yuejin, Fanrong

References

Districts of Qiqihar